The women's 4 × 5 kilometre relay cross-country skiing competition at the 2002 Winter Olympics in Salt Lake City, United States, was held on 19 February at Soldier Hollow.

At Nagano in 1998, the Russians won over the Norwegians, but this time were forced to scratch due to positive drug tests from Larissa Lazutina and Olga Danilova.

Race summary
In Russia's absence due to doping, Germany took an early lead in the first leg. Switzerland, Slovenia, and Norway trailed after Germany the first leg. Norway went ahead on the second leg, 2.7 seconds ahead of Germany, as they both distanced themselves from Switzerland, which was third. Norway stayed ahead by the third and final exchange, nine seconds over Germany, and another seven seconds ahead of Switzerland. On the anchor leg, Germany's Evi Sachenbacher caught Norway's anchor, Anita Moen, and pulled ahead 100 metres from the finish line to win the gold medal for Germany. Switzerland won the bronze medal.

Results
Each team used four skiers, with each completing racing over the same 5 kilometre circuit. The first two raced in the classical style, and the final pair of skiers raced freestyle.

The race was started at 12:30.

References

External links
 Sports reference

Women's cross-country skiing at the 2002 Winter Olympics
Women's 4 × 5 kilometre relay cross-country skiing at the Winter Olympics